Defensive meritorious badge (Japanese: 防衛功労章) is the decorative insignia for the Members of Japan Self-Defense Forces. The Officials who have been won Special Encomium, 1st Encomium, 2nd Encomium, or 3rd Encomium are given as the supplementary prize.

Sorts
The shape is the rays of the rising sun which is vertically long. If the several badges were given, the winner must wear the only highest badge.

See also
Defensive memorial cordon

Military awards and decorations of Japan